The 1954 Pepperdine Waves football team represented George Pepperdine College as an independent during the 1954 college football season. Pepperdine had been a member of the California Collegiate Athletic Association (CCAA) for the previous four seasons. The team was led by second-year head coach Gordon McEachron and played home games at El Camino Stadium on the campus of El Camino College in Torrance, California. They finished the season with a record of 6–2.

Schedule

Team players in the NFL
No Pepperdine players were selected in the 1955 NFL Draft.

The following finished their Pepperdine career in 1954, were not drafted, but played in the NFL.

Notes

References

Pepperdine
Pepperdine Waves football seasons
Pepperdine Waves football